Nargesi-ye Deli Qayid Shafi (also Romanized as Nargesī-ye Delī Qāyīd Shafī‘) is a village in Javid-e Mahuri Rural District, in the Central District of Mamasani County, Fars Province, Iran. At the 2006 census, its population was 28, in 8 families.

References 

Populated places in Mamasani County